The discography of American Christian music artist Lauren Daigle consists of three studio albums, one extended play (EP), five singles, and seven other charted songs.

Albums

Studio albums

Christmas albums

Extended plays

Singles

As lead artist

As featured artist

Other charted songs

Promotional singles

Other appearances
 "Darkness Falls" – The Assemblie featuring Lauren Daigle (The Assemblie - EP)
 "Nothing More" – Aaron Shust featuring Lauren Daigle (Doxology)
 "Almost Human" on the Blade Runner 2049 motion picture soundtrack
 "Back To God" With Reba McEntire on My Kind Of Christmas.

Compilation appearances
 Christmas: Joy to the World – "Light of the World", "The First Noel"
 Come Alive: Live from the CentricWorship Retreat – "Come Alive (Dry Bones) [Live]", "You Have My Surrender (Live)"
 North Point Music: Beginnings – "It Is Well"
 Hear (Live) - "Close", "You Alone" – North Point InsideOut featuring Lauren Daigle
 WOW Hits 2016 – "How Can It Be"
 WOW Hits 2017 – "Trust in You"
 Conqueror (compilation album by Gabby Douglas) – "First"
 All the Earth (compilation album by The Belonging Co) – "Peace Be Still"
 WOW Christmas 2017 – "Have Yourself a Merry Little Christmas"
 WOW Hits 2018 – "Come Alive (Dry Bones)"
 WOW Hits 2019 – "O'Lord", "Hard Love" – Needtobreathe featuring Lauren Daigle
 Now That's What I Call Music! 68 (US) – "You Say"

Notes

References

Christian music discographies
Discographies of American artists